Tombelaine is a small tidal island off the coast of Normandy in France.  It lies a few kilometres north of Mont Saint-Michel.  At low tide the island can be reached on foot (with a guide) from the coast of Cotentin,  to the northeast, and from Mont Saint-Michel.

The island lies just to the south of the course of the Sélune river, which has to be forded to access the island from Cotentin. It is composed of granite. It is in the commune of Genêts.

Name 

According to popular etymology the name means "the tomb of Hélène", from a princess named Hélène, daughter of King Hoël, said to have been buried on the rock.

The name could also come from tumulus belenis, the "tumulus of Belenos", a Celtic god, or from Celtic words meaning "the little mountain", in contrast with Mont St-Michel.

History 
In the 11th century, two monks from Mont Saint-Michel were hermits on Tombelaine.  In 1137 Bernard du Bec founded a priory on the island, and it became a place of pilgrimage.

On 11 February 1423, in the Hundred Years War, Tombelaine was occupied by the English as a base to attack Mont Saint-Michel. In the 16th-century French religious wars, Gabriel, comte de Montgomery, leader of the Huguenot armies, occupied the island.

In 1666 the marquis de la Chastrière ordered the destruction of the island's fortifications, in case they were again used by the English.

At the end of the 19th century a legend about the 'Marquis de Tombelaine' was created as part of the burgeoning tourist industry around Mont Saint-Michel.

The island was purchased by the state in 1933, and was declared a historic monument by a decree of 1936. It became a bird reserve in 1985.

References 

Islands of Normandy
Tidal islands of France
Landforms of Manche